Saugestad is a Norwegian surname.

Notable people with this surname include:
 Ed Saugestad (1937–2014), American ice hockey coach
 Frode Saugestad (born 1974), Norwegian scholar
 Oluf A. Saugestad (1840-1926), Norwegian-American politician
 Stian Saugestad (born 1992), Norwegian alpine skier

See also
Saugstad

Norwegian-language surnames